The Organization for Tropical Studies (OTS), founded in 1963, is a non-profit consortium of over 50 universities and research institutions based in the United States, Latin America, and South Africa. OTS manages a network  of ecological research stations in Costa Rica and South Africa. The North American Office is located on the Duke University campus in Durham, North Carolina. OTS offers a variety of courses in Spanish and English for high school, university, and graduate students. Most of the coursework and research conducted at OTS stations focuses on tropical ecology, and the three research stations in Costa Rica are located in distinct ecoregions.

Along with Cocha Cashu Biological Station and the Manu Learning Centre in Peru, and the Smithsonian Tropical Research Institute on Barro Colorado Island in Panama, the OTS research stations in general (and La Selva in particular) provide some of the most important and productive sites of original research on neotropical ecology.

OTS research stations in Costa Rica:

·        La Selva Biological Station: lowland tropical rainforest on the Caribbean lowlands

·        Palo Verde Biological Station: tropical dry forest and seasonal freshwater wetlands on north western 

·        Las Cruces Biological Station: montane rainforest (including higher elevation cloud forest) and site of the Wilson Botanical Garden

OTS research station in South Africa:

·        Skukuza Science Leadership Centre: Kruger National Park

See also

External links
Official OTS website
 La Selva Protected Zone at Costa Rica National Parks

Environmental organizations based in Costa Rica
Organizations established in 1963
1963 establishments in Costa Rica